Aurelio Mario Gabriel Francisco García Menocal y Deop (December 17, 1866 – September 7, 1941) was the 3rd President of Cuba, serving from 1913 to 1921.  His term as president saw Cuba's participation in World War I.

Youth
Born in Jagüey Grande, Matanzas, Cuba, García Menocal was thirteen when he was sent to boarding schools in the United States, first at the Chappaqua Mountain Institute in New York, and later at the Maryland Agricultural College. In 1884, he then went to Cornell University where he graduated in 1888 from the School of Engineering. While at Cornell University, he was a member of the Delta Kappa Epsilon fraternity (Delta Chi Chapter). As a young man he was involved in Cuba's fight for independence from Spain. When Cuba did receive independence following the Spanish–American War, García Menocal became a leading conservative politician.

First Term in Office (1913 - 1917)
Mario García Menocal was elected president in 1912 and became known for his strong support of business and corporations. 
In late July 1914 the alliance the National Conservative Party (Cuba) had with a branch of the Liberal Party of Cuba was broken resulting in Menocal losing control of the Cuban Congress.
On May 19, 1915, editor of newspaper La Tribuna, Enrique Mazas, was arrested on charges of libel against President Menocal. It is claimed that Mr. Mazas wrote an article against President Menocal demanding that he resign either from his position as President of Cuba or General Inspector of the Chappara Sugar Company. In essence, Mazas accused Menocal of using public funds to cover his travel expenses whenever he visited the Chaparra sugar mill (presently in Las Tunas Province) as inspector of the sugar mill.

On September 20, 1916, President Menocal established the Cuban Naval Academy situated at the time in Castillo de Rubens near the Mariel harbour.

On November 1, 1916, President Menocal was re-elected during the 1916 Cuban general election. The elections were highly disputed with many, including scholars such as Gerardo Castellanos, claiming they were outright fraudulent. Political infighting following the highly disputed elections resulted in civil strife and rebellion. On February 11, 1917, Commander Luis Solano rose up against Menocal, whereas the supreme chief of this rebellion was former President José Miguel Gómez. The rebellion proved unsuccessful largely as a result of internal divisions within the ranks, and the support provided to Menocal by then U.S. ambassador, William Elliot Gonzalez. Menocal followed suit in suppressing various newspapers associating with the Liberal Party of Cuba such as Heraldo de Cuba, La Nacion and La Prensa.

In perhaps his most notable action, García Menocal authorized Cuba's declaration of war against the German Empire on April 7, 1917, entering World War I a day after the United States. This was believed by many to be an attempt to get the United States to give more support to his government. In December, war was also declared against Austria-Hungary.

Second Term in Office (1917 - 1921)
By mid June 1917 the rebellion, led by José Miguel Gómez and other Cuban army officers had mostly been quashed 
In July 1917, President Menocal suspended certain constitutional guarantees and called an extra session of Congress.

Constitutional guarantees were only restored more than 1 year later on August 14, 1918, by another presidential decree following a proclamation by Menocal.

While in office, García Menocal hosted the 1920 Delta Kappa Epsilon National Convention, the first international fraternity conference outside the US, which took place in Cuba.  Private trains were hired from New England to Florida where the invited men and their families could travel in comfort and style, and upon arrival in Cuba, each man was gifted a gold-trimmed box of cigars.  García Menocal's hospitality is still remembered in the fraternity to this day. He was responsible for creating the Cuban Peso; until his presidency Cuba used both the Spanish Real and US Dollar.

According to Gerardo Castellanos, President Menocal left the Cuban national treasury in overdraft and therefore in precarious financial situation. Menocal supposedly spent $800 million during his 8 years in office and left a floating debt of $40 million.

Later life
After his presidency, García Menocal continued to be involved in politics, running for president again in 1924. He attempted a revolution in 1931 and went into exile in the United States when it failed. After less than five years he returned to Cuba and ran for president a final time in 1936. He died in Santiago de Cuba, Cuba.

Family
García Menocal was married to Mariana Seva y Rodríguez and they had three children, Mario (who married Hortensia Almagro), Raúl (who married Perlita Fowler) and Georgina García Menocal y Seva (who married Eugenio Sardina).

Notes and references

Sources
 
 Fogle, Homer William Jr. (25 Nov 2005). The Deke House at Cornell: A Concise History of the Delta Chi Chapter of Delta Kappa Epsilon, 1870–1930. Cf. pp. 27, 57, 60, 64, 66–69. Retrieved 2010-12-02.
 Minot, John Clair (February 1921). "The Convention in Havana", Delta Kappa Epsilon Quarterly, XXXIX, 1, p. 1–25.

External links 
 

1866 births
1941 deaths
People from Jagüey Grande
Cuban people of Spanish descent
Cuban nobility
Presidents of Cuba
Conservatism in Cuba
1910s in Cuba
1920s in Cuba
20th-century Cuban politicians
Cornell University College of Engineering alumni
Democratic National Association politicians